Hugo III of Chalon (c. 1260 – c. 1312) was a cleric from Free County of Burgundy.

Hugues was a son of Jean "the old" of Chalon (1190–1267), Sire of Salins and his third wife Laura of Commercy (d. 1275), sister of Simon IV, Count of Saarbrücken. His nephew Jean of Châlon (1300 – c.1334), son of Jean I, Seigneur of Châlon-Arlay, the Bishop of Basel, and Bishop of Langres and Peer of France.

He studied theology in Paris and was an archdeacon in Laon. From 1295 to 1301 he was prince-bishop of Liège, appointed by Pope Boniface VIII. Jean played a role in the conflict between Awans and Waroux (fr) (1297–1335), and supported with the siege of Awans until their surrender. Hugues could not prevent military action from both sides and the war continued for decades. There were other conflicts around Liège too, with the Count of Namur and rebels on one side, and the Duke of Brabant and the Count of Loon on the other side with the bishop.

In 1300 he defended himself before the Roman curia in Rome against charges from the cathedral chapter and others, that he had defrauded his brother John I of Chalon-Auxerre and that he had sold off ecclesiastical possessions for benefits and allegiances. Pope Boniface VIII removed him from his bishopric at Liège and instead made him Archbishop of Besançon.

Hugues participated in the Council of Vienne (1311–1312) convoked by Pope Clement V, where he contracted an illness and died, probably around 22 February 1312.

Ancestry

See also

References
FMG: Family details of Jean d'Auxonne, his father

Prince-Bishops of Liège
Archbishops of Besançon
13th-century Roman Catholic bishops in the Holy Roman Empire
14th-century French Roman Catholic bishops
Chalon-Arlay
Year of birth uncertain
1260s births
1310s deaths
Medieval French nobility
People from Franche-Comté